Line 1 of Luoyang Subway is the first metro line to open in Luoyang, Henan, China, which opened on 28 March 2021. The line is currently 25.342 km long with 19 stations.

Opening timeline

Stations

References

Luoyang Subway lines
Railway lines opened in 2021
2021 establishments in China